In category theory, filtered categories generalize the notion of directed set understood as a category (hence called a  directed category; while some use directed category as a synonym for a filtered category). There is a dual notion of cofiltered category, which will be recalled below.

Filtered categories

A category  is filtered when
 it is not empty,

A filtered colimit is a colimit of a functor  where  is a filtered category.

Cofiltered categories
A category  is cofiltered if the opposite category  is filtered.  In detail, a category is cofiltered when
 it is not empty,

A cofiltered limit is a limit of a functor  where  is a cofiltered category.

Ind-objects and pro-objects

Given a small category , a presheaf of sets  that is a small filtered colimit of representable presheaves, is called an ind-object of the category . Ind-objects of a category  form a full subcategory  in the category of functors (presheaves) .

κ-filtered categories
There is a variant of "filtered category" known as a "κ-filtered category", defined as follows. The existence of cocones for these three shapes of diagrams turns out to imply that cocones exist for any finite diagram; in other words, a category  is filtered (according to the above definition) if and only if there is a cocone over any finite diagram .

(A small diagram is of cardinality κ if the morphism set of its domain is of cardinality κ.)

A κ-filtered colimit is a colimit of a functor  where  is a κ-filtered category.

References
 Artin, M., Grothendieck, A. and Verdier, J.-L. Séminaire de Géométrie Algébrique du Bois Marie (SGA 4). Lecture Notes in Mathematics 269, Springer Verlag, 1972.  Exposé I, 2.7.
 , section IX.1.

Category theory